Niklora is a village located in Pulwama district of Jammu and Kashmir. It is situated on the left bank of Rambi river.
It comprises Bonpora, New colony areas.

References

Villages in Pulwama district